Chhapar Rangran is a village in the Tosham tehsil of the Bhiwani district in the Indian state of Haryana. This village was established by Thakur Kishore Singh 276 years ago. His father's name was Thakur Gulab Singh. This village was a principality of 52 villages, historically named as Kishorgarh. There are many historical buildings like Fort (Garh), Shivalya, old well etc made by Kishor Singh.
 
Even today, the stronghold and palace of Thakur Kishore Singh are present in the middle of the village. There were two queens of Kishore Singh. The elder queen was from Jaisalmer (Rajasthan) and the second queen was from Talwandi (Haryana). The sons of the elder queen settled many villages. The village Shungarpur, Badalwala are extended from of this village. Tanwar families of this village are also settled in Hetampura, Pilkhua (Uttar Pradesh). The younger queen had two sons - Bhodu Singh and Bhojraj Singh, whose children are settled in this village.

In today's era, President (Kshatriya Mahasabha, Rajput Ekta Manch, Sarvajatiya Sangharsh Samiti) Vedpal Tanwar is one of them.

References

Villages in Bhiwani district